Apu, Azerbaijan may refer to:
Aşağı Apu, Azerbaijan
Yuxarı Apu, Azerbaijan